is a Japanese manga series written and illustrated by Inio Asano. It was serialized in Shogakukan's seinen manga magazine Big Comic Superior from March to July 2017, with its chapters collected in a single tankōbon volume. A live action film adaptation premiered in March 2023.

Media

Manga
Written and illustrated by Inio Asano, Downfall was serialized in Shogakukan's seinen manga magazine Big Comic Superior from March 10 to July 28, 2017. Shogakukan collected its chapters in a single tankōbon volume, released on October 30, 2017.

In North America, the manga was licensed for English release by Viz Media. The volume was released on February 18, 2020.

Live-action film
In October 2022, it was announced that the manga will receive a live action film adaptation, premiered in Japan on March 17, 2023. It was directed by Naoto Takenaka, starring Takumi Saitoh as Kaoru Fukusawa, Shuri as Chifuyu and Megumi as Nozomi Machida.

Reception
The manga debuted at #27 on Oricon's weekly chart of the best-selling manga (27,953 copies sold). The series ranked #12, alongside 1122: For a Happy Marriage, on "The Best Manga 2018 Kono Manga wo Yome!" ranking by Freestyle magazine.

References

Further reading

External links
 

Drama anime and manga
Manga adapted into films
Seinen manga
Shogakukan manga
Viz Media manga